Victor Manson Spencer (1 November 1896 – 24 February 1918) was a volunteer from Invercargill, New Zealand who fought in the Otago Infantry Regiment of the New Zealand Division in World War I. Spencer was executed for desertion on 24 February 1918, despite later suggestions that he was severely traumatised by shellshock, having fought and survived several campaigns.

New Zealand soldiers were subject to New Zealand military law which, like all nations involved in the conflict, had the death penalty for a number of crimes, including desertion. Out of the 28 death penalties handed down by the New Zealand military. only four were carried out, the rest being quashed by the British commanders of the armies involved. (In addition, New Zealand Private Jack Braithwaite was executed by the British for mutiny.) By contrast, death penalties imposed on Australian soldiers had to be confirmed by the Governor-General, which the Australian government did not allow, although Australians were hanged at Shepton Mallet prison for civil crimes.

Spencer was formally pardoned, along with Braithwaite and the three others, under the provisions of the Pardon for Soldiers of the Great War Act 2000, which was passed by the New Zealand Parliament in a departure from custom, since pardons are normally granted by the Crown and are rarely posthumous. The grounds for the pardon was that the execution was not a fate that Spencer deserved, but was one that resulted from (a) the harsh discipline that was believed at the time to be required; and (b) the application of the death penalty for military offences being seen at that time as an essential part of maintaining military discipline.

Section 8 of the Pardon for Soldiers of the Great War Act reads thus:

Spencer was included in the mass pardon of 306 British Empire soldiers executed for certain offences during the Great War enacted in section 359 of the UK Parliament's Armed Forces Act 2006, and which came into effect by Royal Assent on 8 November 2006.

He is buried in The Huts Cemetery, Dikkebus, West-Vlaanderen, Belgium.

References

External links
Last soldier executed  
New Zealand Herald article
Victor Spencer a fight for justice
Memorial 'Shot at Dawn' to Victor Spencer and four other soldiers

1896 births
1918 deaths
New Zealand military personnel of World War I
New Zealand Expeditionary Force personnel executed during World War I
People who were court-martialed
People executed for desertion
Recipients of New Zealand royal pardons
People from Invercargill
Burials at Dickebusch New Military Commonwealth War Graves Commission Cemetery and Extension